is a Japanese manga series written and illustrated by Chika Shiina. Published by Shogakukan, it was serialized on Cheese! magazine, with five tankōbon volumes compiling the chapters released so far. A Japanese television drama series adaptation aired on TBS from July to September 2015.

In 2017, 37.5°C no Namida won the 62nd Shogakukan Manga Award in the shōjo category.

Plot
As Momoko Sugisaki is working in a child care service, she has a tough time learning how to react to the children in need of her help, since the child care she is working for specializes in in-home day care for sick children. Trying to find out when the rules should be overlooked to satisfy the needs of the sick children. Growing up with them, Momoko is able to tell how one person can make a difference to the lives of the children.

Characters
Momoko Sugisaki (played by Misako Renbutsu)
Motoharu Asahina (played by Hiroki Narimiya)
Chikara Yanagi (played by Naohito Fujiki)
Megumi Seki (played by Miki Mizuno)
Kensuke Shinohara (played by Mokomichi Hayami)
Koyuki Asahina (played by Hana Matsushima)
Koharu Asahina (played by Rio Suzuki)
Fumiko Asagiri (played by Atsuko Asano)
Yumika Ono (played by Reina Triendl)
Yuki Sugisaki (played by Kensei Mikami)
Kumiko Shinohara (played by Saori Takizawa)
Nishiki Sato (played by Kazuhiko Nishimura)
Yoko Sato (played by Maki Kubota)
Satomi Mori (played by Noriko Nakagoshi)
Risa Machii (played by Shuri)
Kanako Imai (played by Natsuko Nagaike)
Teppei Kato (played by Yuya Kido)
Sayaka Sato (played by Risako Tanigawa)
Seiichiro Sugisaki (played by Tosei Ishida)
Kaori Shimizu (played by Yui Tanoue)
Kenta Shinohara (played by Ayumu Yokoyama)
Masayo Tanaka (played by Jun Miho)
Kaito Mori (played by Yusaku Hayashida)

Media

Manga
1 (March 26, 2014)
2 (July 25, 2014)
3 (November 26, 2014)
4 (June 26, 2015)
5 (November 26, 2015)
6 (March 25, 2016)

Drama
A Japanese television drama series adaptation aired on TBS from July 9 to September 17, 2015.

Reception
37.5°C no Namida won the 62nd Shogakukan Manga Award in the shōjo category in 2017. As of January 2022, the cumulative circulation including the digital version has exceeded 3 million copies.

References

External links
37.5°C no Namida on Cheese! 

2015 Japanese television series debuts
Shogakukan manga
Shogakukan franchises
Shōjo manga
Manga adapted into television series
Winners of the Shogakukan Manga Award for shōjo manga